Lasse Nielsen (3 March 1987) is a Danish former professional footballer who played as a centre-back.

Career
Nielsen came through the ranks of second division side Næstved BK and made his first-team debut in 2005. On 4 July 2011, he signed a three-year contract with rivals FC Vestsjælland. Two years later, Nielsen and Vestsjælland reached promotion to the Danish Superliga and he made his debut in the highest tier on 21 July 2013 in a 1–1 draw away against Brøndby IF. During the season, Nielsen formed a partnership in central defense with Jean-Claude Bozga, and the duo allowed the fewest goals on headers of all Superliga-clubs early on in the season.

His performances during the 2013–14 season attracted interest from various Superliga-clubs and on 14 June 2014, Nielsen signed a two-year contract on a free transfer with OB. His first season at OB resulted in 32 appearances in which he scored two goals. OB, however, struggled, and the club ended on a disappointing ninth place in the league table. He saw less playing time the following season, making 21 appearances and scoring no goals.

On 18 May 2016, with Nielsen's contract expiring in OB, he was signed by Polish Ekstraklasa club Lech Poznań on a three-year deal. On 7 July 2016, Nielsen won the Polish SuperCup in a 4–1 win over Legia Warsaw, making his first start and scoring his first goal for the club. He made seven starts in his first 15 league games in Poland, and called the level on which he played a clear "step up" compared to the Danish Superliga.
    
On 23 January 2018, Nielsen signed a three-year contract with Swedish Allsvenskan side Trelleborg, and transferred back to Denmark a year later, signing with Lyngby BK on 30 January 2019.

Nielsen returned to his first senior club, Næstved Boldklub, on 9 August 2020. He was assigned a leading role in the club, which had recently suffered relegation to the Danish 2nd Division. He retired from football in June 2022, to instead become assistant coach of Næstved.

Career statistics

1 Including Polish SuperCup.

Honours

Club
Lech Poznań
 Polish SuperCup: 2016

References

External links
 Eliteprospects Profile
 
 

1993 births
Living people
Danish men's footballers
Association football defenders
Allsvenskan players
Danish 1st Division players
Danish 2nd Division players
Danish Superliga players
Danish expatriate men's footballers
Danish expatriate sportspeople in Poland
Danish expatriate sportspeople in Sweden
Ekstraklasa players
Expatriate footballers in Poland
Expatriate footballers in Sweden
FC Vestsjælland players
Lech Poznań players
Lyngby Boldklub players
Næstved Boldklub players
Odense Boldklub players
Trelleborgs FF players